Héctor Soberón Lorenzo (born August 11, 1964), better known as Héctor Soberón, is a Mexican actor.

Acting career
Hector Soberon is a well known theater, film and television actor. He was born in Mexico City. He obtained a bachelor's degree as an electronic engineer and his artistic career began as a professional model in 1987. Emphasized by his discipline, Hector was awarded with the "omni" as the best model for pasarela and fixed photography. He filmed over 100 TV. Commercials for outstanding brands and was selected to be the only model for Hugo Boss in Mexico in that time. In 1992 begins his TV. Trajectory as an actor, working for the two mayor broadcasting companies of greater international prestige in Mexico ( Televisa and TV.Azteca ) where he participated in many series and soap operas of great success such as: "Muchachitas", "Maria la del Barrio", "el Amor no es como lo pintan", "papa soltero" and "mi pequena traviesa" among others. He has participated in films, like just to name a few : "morena", "sexual education in brief lessons", "la curva del olvido" while in the international arena he shares credits with Harvey Keitel and Miguel Sandoval in the film called "Puerto Vallarta Squeeze", and also "cuento sin hadas", "carpem diem". In theater his most outstanding projection came with his participation in the play "ps. Your Cat is Dead" sharing credits with famous actor Mr. Otto Sirgo, where they were both awarded bye the critics as revelations for the years 1997. Hector has also participated as a host for festivals like "Acapulco Fest" and recently participated in radio broadcasting with his own programs. In 2005 Hector decides to go one step forward with his acting career by immigrating to the United States of America, where he was very well received by the audiences after personifying a villain for the soap opera "olvidarte jamas" produced by Univision. Recently we saw him acting the role of a personal disease in the productions "other people's sins" by Telemundo. Hector is currently participating in several projects where emphasizes his passion to his career by delivering all his professionalism, and respect in every single project where he is involved.

Films
 2011: Cuento sin hadas
 2009: Carpe Diem as Alain
 2008: Mea Culpa as Raúl Villanueva
 2005: Cafe Estrés
 2004: La curva del olvido
 2003: Puerto Vallarta Squeeze as Rivera's Driver
 1997: Campeón
 1994: Educación sexual en breves lecciones as Esteban
 1994: Morena as Juan Casas

Telenovelas
 2017: Milagros de Navidad as Marquez
 2014: Siempre Tuya Acapulco as Ulises Santander
 2011: Corazon Apasionado as Alvaro Martinez
 2010: Alguien Te Mira as Daniel Vidal
 2007–2008: Pecados Ajenos as Gary Mendoza
 2006: Mi Vida Eres Tu as Lucho
 2006: Acorralada as Horacio
 2006: Olvidarte Jamas as Renato
 2001: Como En El Cine as Enrique
 2000: El amor no es como lo pintan as César Segovia Sabatié
 1999: Marea Brava as Daniel
 1998: Gotita de amor as Dr. Alberto
 1997: Mi pequeña traviesa as Alberto Miranda
 1996: Para toda la vida as Alfredo
 1995: María la del Barrio as Vladimir de la Vega
 1995: María José as Darío
 1992: Mágica juventud as Miguel
 1991: Muchachitas'' as Víctor

External links

 Profile on Romantica, a Polish telenovela website

1964 births
Living people
Mexican male film actors
Mexican male stage actors
Mexican male telenovela actors
Male actors from Mexico City
Mexican emigrants to the United States